Wilhelm Gottlieb Tennemann (7 December 1761 – 30 September 1819) was a German historian of philosophy.

Life
He was born and educated at Erfurt. In 1788, he became a lecturer on the history of philosophy at the University of Jena. Ten years later he became a professor at the same university, where he remained till 1804. His great work is an eleven-volume history of philosophy (Geschichte der Philosophie), which he began at Jena and finished at the University of Marburg, where he was professor of philosophy from 1804 till his death. He was one of the numerous German philosophers who accepted the Kantian theory as a revelation.

In 1812 he published a shorter history of philosophy (Grundriss der Geschichte der Philosophie für den akademischen Unterricht), which was translated into English in 1852 under the title A manual of the history of philosophy.

He died at Marburg.

See also
 Allegorical interpretations of Plato

References

Attribution

1761 births
1819 deaths
18th-century German philosophers
German historians of philosophy
Writers from Erfurt
Academic staff of the University of Jena
Academic staff of the University of Marburg
German male non-fiction writers
19th-century German philosophers